Benita Ferrero-Waldner (born 5 September 1948) is an Austrian diplomat and politician, and a member of the conservative Austrian People's Party (ÖVP). Ferrero-Waldner served as Foreign Minister of Austria 2000–2004 and was the candidate of the Austrian People's Party in the 2004 Austrian presidential election, which she narrowly lost with 47.6% of the votes. She served as the European Commissioner for External Relations and European Neighbourhood Policy from 2004 to 2009, and as the European Commissioner for Trade and European Neighbourhood Policy from 2009 to 2010.

Early life and education
Born in Salzburg, Waldner took her matura exams in 1966 and then studied law, receiving a doctorate from the University of Salzburg in 1970.

Career
Until 1983 Waldner worked in the private sector. Only in 1984 did she enter the diplomatic service. One of her most influential positions was Chef de protocole for Secretary General Boutros-Ghali at the UN in New York City.

From 1995 until 2000 Ferrero-Waldner served as Under-Secretary of State in two governments led by Social Democrats Franz Vranitzky and Viktor Klima. When Wolfgang Schüssel became Chancellor of Austria early in 2000 he made Ferrero-Waldner his Minister for Foreign Affairs, a position she held until October 2004, when she was succeeded by Ursula Plassnik.

In January 2004 it was announced that Ferrero-Waldner would run for president of Austria to succeed Thomas Klestil in July 2004. Her candidature was supported by the Austrian People's Party; her only opponent was Heinz Fischer. However, she lost the election on 25 April.

Member of the European Commission, 2004–2010
In late July 2004 Ferrero-Waldner was nominated the successor of Franz Fischler as Austria's European Commissioner. She took office on 22 November. Her portfolio was Foreign Affairs and European Neighbourhood Policy.

As the EU's External Affairs Commissioner, Ferrero-Waldner is credited with being the key diplomat in the 24 July 2007 release of five Bulgarian nurses and a Palestinian doctor imprisoned by Libya. They had been held more than 8 years on charges of purposefully infecting children with HIV, and have continued to profess their innocence. The commissioner made many trips to Libya and met with the prisoners regularly. She also worked to improve conditions for children infected with HIV/Aids.

Life after politics
In September 2009 Ferrero-Waldner ran for the post of UNESCO Director-General but lost to the Bulgarian candidate Irina Bokova. Since leaving politics, she has held a variety of paid and unpaid positions, including the following:

 Munich Re, member of the supervisory board (since 2010)
 United Nations Voluntary Trust Fund for Victims of Trafficking in Persons, President of the Board of Trustees (2017–2020)
 European Institute of the Mediterranean (IEMed), Member of the Advisory Council
 Graduate School for Global and International Studies, University of Salamanca, Member of the Advisory Board

In February 2020, Ferrero-Waldner joined around fifty former European prime ministers and foreign ministers in signing an open letter published by British newspaper The Guardian to condemn U.S. president Donald Trump's Middle East peace plan, saying it would create an apartheid-like situation in occupied Palestinian territory.

Personal life
From 1974 until 1983 Waldner was married to Wolfgang Sterr, a Bavarian high school teacher. However, their marriage ended in divorce. In 1993 Waldner married Francisco Ferrero Campos, a lecturer in Spanish and Latin American literature at the University of Vienna.

After her previous marriage had finally been annulled Ferrero-Waldner married her husband again in church in December 2003. The couple does not have any children.

References

External links
November 2004 – November 2009 Member of the European Commission in charge of External Relations and European Neighbourhood Policy
November 2009 – February 2010 Member of the European Commission in charge of Trade, the European Neighbourhood Policy and the EuropeAid – Cooperation Office (Aidco).
Born between Salzburg and Braunau am Inn

|-

|-

|-

|-

|-

1948 births
Living people
Politicians from Salzburg
Austrian women diplomats
Austrian European Commissioners
Austrian Roman Catholics
Women government ministers of Austria
Foreign ministers of Austria
Grand Crosses with Star and Sash of the Order of Merit of the Federal Republic of Germany
Candidates for President of Austria
University of Salzburg alumni
Female foreign ministers
Women European Commissioners
European Commissioners 2004–2009
European Commissioners 2009–2014